Dhopakhali Union is a union parishad of Dhanbari Upazila, Tangail District, Bangladesh. It is situated 57 km north of Tangail.

Demographics

According to Population Census 2011 performed by Bangladesh Bureau of Statistics, The total population of Dhopakhali union is 22953. There are 5897 households in total.

Education

The literacy rate of Dhopakhali Union is 40.6% (Male-41.6%, Female-39.5%).

See also
 Union Councils of Tangail District

References

Populated places in Dhaka Division
Populated places in Tangail District
Unions of Dhanbari Upazila